Thorigné is a former commune in the Deux-Sèvres department in western France. On 1 January 2017, it was merged into the short-lived commune Mougon-Thorigné, that was merged into the new commune Aigondigné on 1 January 2019.

Population

See also
Communes of the Deux-Sèvres department

References

Former communes of Deux-Sèvres
Populated places disestablished in 2017